Scary Movie 3 is a 2003 American parody film which parodies the horror, sci-fi, and mystery genres. It is the sequel to Scary Movie 2 and is the third film in the Scary Movie film series, and the first to be directed by David Zucker.

The film stars Anna Faris and Regina Hall reprising their roles as Cindy Campbell and Brenda Meeks, respectively. New cast members include Charlie Sheen, Simon Rex, Anthony Anderson, Kevin Hart, and Leslie Nielsen. It is the first film in the series to feature no involvement from the Wayans family. The characters of Shorty Meeks and Ray Wilkins, previously played by Shawn and Marlon Wayans, do not appear, nor are they referenced.

The film's plot significantly parodies the films The Ring, Signs, The Matrix Reloaded and 8 Mile. The film grossed $220.7 million worldwide, becoming the second highest grossing film in the series. It is the last film in the series to be released by The Walt Disney Company's subsidiary Miramax Films, under the brand Dimension Films. It was named the 2004 Teen Choice Awards in the category of Choice Movie: Your Parents Didn't Want You to See.

Plot 
Katie and Becca talk about what Katie believes is a sex tape, but Becca calls it a cursed tape. After several odd occurrences, they both die. Meanwhile, in a farm outside Washington, D.C., widowed farmer Tom Logan and his brother George discover a crop circle, saying "Attack Here!", after noticing the dogs' strange activity.

Cindy Campbell, now a reporter, announces the crop circles on the news. She picks up her paranormally endowed nephew Cody from school, where her best friend Brenda Meeks is his teacher. George picks up his niece Sue, who is in the same class. Cindy and George quickly become attracted to one another, and George invites her and Brenda to a rap-battle with his rapper friends Mahalik and CJ. George proves to be talented but is violently thrown out after he raises his unintentionally pointy white hood.

After watching the cursed videotape, Brenda asks Cindy to keep her company. After playing several pranks on Cindy, the girl from the cursed tape, Tabitha, fights with and kills Brenda. George receives a phone call about the death, and Tom meets with Sayaman, who apologizes for the accident involving himself and Tom's wife Annie.

During Brenda's wake, George and Mahalik wreak havoc in an unsuccessful attempt to revive her, only to blow up her body and get kicked out of the house. Cindy finds the cursed tape in Brenda's room, watches it, and receives a phone call warning her of her death in seven days. She calls George, CJ and Mahalik for help. CJ says his Aunt Shaneequa might be able to help. Shaneequa, the Matrix Oracle, and her husband Orpheus agree to watch the tape with her. Shaneequa discovers the hidden image of a lighthouse and gets in a fight with Tabitha's mother. Shaneequa tells Cindy to find the lighthouse to break the curse. When Cindy returns home, she finds Cody watched the tape.

At work, Cindy searches through pictures of lighthouses before finding the one from the tape. Desperate to save Cody, Cindy warns everyone by entering a message into the news anchor's teleprompter. Her boss interrupts her, and the anchor mechanically recites the wrong message. The Logans take it seriously since they encountered an alien disguised as Michael Jackson, and President Baxter Harris personally visits the farm to investigate the crop circles. Cindy visits the lighthouse, where she encounters The Architect. The loquacious old man explains Tabitha was his evil adopted daughter, whom his wife drowned in the farm's well, but not before she imprinted her evil onto the tape. Unfortunately, he mistakenly returned it to Blockbuster believing it was Pootie Tang, unleashing the curse. When Cindy asks about how this relates to the Aliens, the Architect speculates that Tabitha is summoning them to aid her in destroying the human race.

Returning home, Cindy discovers her station has been broadcasting the evil tape for hours, and there have been various sightings of aliens around the world. Worse, Cody is missing. Cindy tracks him to the Logan farm, where he has taken refuge with George. Tom orders everybody into the basement for safety, as he, George and Mahalik go outside to fight the extraterrestrials. The aliens arrive but reveal they are friendly and have come to stop Tabitha, since they accidentally watched the tape on a broadcast they had intercepted, again believing it was Pootie Tang.

In the basement, Cindy recognizes the farm's cellar from the tape, and she finds the well where Tabitha drowned. Suddenly, Tabitha appears behind her. A short fight ensues, during which Tabitha takes Cody hostage. Cindy and George appeal to her, offering her a place in their family. Tabitha transforms into a little girl and claims her curse is broken, but changes back to her monstrous form and says she was “just screwing on them”. As she advances on Cindy and the others, President Harris opens a door and accidentally knocks her into the well. The aliens leave in peace, and Cindy and George get married. Leaving for their honeymoon, they realize they left Cody behind. After Cindy avoids hitting Cody at an intersection, Cody breathes a sigh of relief and another car strikes him.

Cast 

 Anna Faris as Cindy Campbell
 Charlie Sheen as Tom Logan
 Regina Hall as Brenda Meeks
 Simon Rex as George Logan
 Leslie Nielsen as President Baxter Harris
 Queen Latifah as Aunt Shaneequa/The Oracle, based on The Oracle from The Matrix
 Anthony Anderson as Mahalik 
 Kevin Hart as CJ Iz
 Camryn Manheim as Trooper Champlin
 George Carlin as The Architect, based on the architect from The Matrix
 Eddie Griffin as Orpheus, based on Morpheus from The Matrix
 Pamela Anderson as Becca Kotler
 Jenny McCarthy as Katie Embry
 Drew Mikuska as Cody Campbell 
 Denise Richards as Annie Logan
 D. L. Hughley as John Wilson
 Ja Rule as Agent Thompson
 Darrell Hammond as Father Muldoon
 Jeremy Piven as Ross Giggins
 Tim Stack as Carson Ward
 Simon Cowell as himself
 Marny Eng as Tabitha, based on Sadako Yamamura from The Ring
 Naomi Lawson-Baird as girl form of Tabitha
 Edward Moss as MJ Alien
 Ajay Naidu as Sayaman
 Tom Kenny and Derek Stephen Prince as the voice of the Aliens
 Jianna Ballard as Sue Logan, based on the Abigail Breslin character Bo Hess from Signs

Rapper cameos 
As well as in "The Rap Battle", several actual rappers assist in the confrontation with the aliens and a subsequent shootout amongst themselves.
 Master P
 RZA
 Raekwon
 Method Man
 Redman
 Macy Gray
 U-God
 Fat Joe

Production 
On November 22, 2002 Dimension Films announced a third Scary Movie without the Wayans brothers returning. The movie was given the title Scary Movie 3: Episode I — Lord of the Brooms, and the movie was supposed to spoof the Star Wars, Lord of the Rings and Harry Potter franchises. Jason Friedberg and Aaron Seltzer were the writers of the movie. David Zucker was going to shoot that script but eventually decided to not use it.

Filming started on March 12, 2003 and wrapped on July 16, 2003. The movie was shot in British Columbia and in Washington, D.C.

Music 
The score for the film was composed by James L. Venable. The original soundtrack was released on October 24, 2003, and features hip hop artists such as Buku Wise, Delinquent Habits, Dame Lee, Kebyar, and others. Frank Fitzpatrick served as music supervisor for the film and soundtrack. Jorge Corante produced and co-wrote the majority of original songs used for the feature.

Release

Home media

Alternate scenes 
The DVD edition includes a director's audio commentary, several deleted scenes and alternate endings (with optional commentary). A "3.5" special DVD was also released, and contained several more deleted scenes than the original DVD, with an unrated version of the film.

In the alternate ending, Cindy is told Cody does not exist by her psychiatrist (played by William Forsythe). After hitting a few people in the face with a shovel, Cindy asks everybody who is not real to stand over at a different spot. Cody goes over there but is followed by Santa Claus. The aliens then begin to invade but George stops them by transforming into The Hulk. President Harris tries to hulk out but ends up soiling his pants. Cindy enters the Logan House, where she is attacked by Tabitha. She is teleported away to Aunt Shaneequa, who teaches her how to defeat Tabitha. Cindy must then confront hundreds of Tabitha's. She wins the battle by performing moves from The Matrix and teleports back to the Logan House. The cast then gets into a car with the President, but are horrified to learn that the driver happens to be M. Night Shyamalan.

One of the scenes that appeared on the Extended DVD named Scary Movie 3.5 was part of the unrated feature. After Pamela Anderson and Jenny McCarthy shut off the TV, the two compliment each other on their good looks. Anderson then asks if McCarthy wants her "shaved pussy", but this turns out to be a furless kitten.

In an extended scene, the person who runs Cody down at the end is shown to be Michael Jackson.

Reception

Box office 
Scary Movie 3 opened at the number one spot in the US, grossing $48.1 million in its opening weekend and $57.5 million for that week.  In its second week, it grossed $24.7 million. At the end of its box office run, Scary Movie 3 grossed $110 million in the US and $110.7 million internationally, making $220.7 million in total.

Critical response 
Scary Movie 3 received a 35% rating on Rotten Tomatoes based on reviews from 131 critics. The site's consensus was "Though an improvement over the second Scary Movie, the laughs are still inconsistent." On Metacritic, it has a score of 49 out of 100 based on reviews from 27 critics, indicating "mixed or average reviews". Audiences surveyed by CinemaScore gave the film a grade "B" on a scale of A+ to F.

See also 
 List of ghost films

References

External links 
 
 
 
 

Scary Movie (film series)
2003 films
2003 comedy horror films
2003 science fiction films
2000s American films
2000s English-language films
2000s parody films
2000s science fiction comedy films
2000s science fiction horror films
2000s supernatural horror films
American comedy horror films
American parody films
American science fiction comedy films
American science fiction horror films
American sequel films
American supernatural comedy films
American supernatural horror films
Cultural depictions of Michael Jackson
Dimension Films films
Films about extraterrestrial life
Films about fictional presidents of the United States
Films about religion
Films about television
Films directed by David Zucker (director)
Films produced by Robert K. Weiss
Films scored by James L. Venable
Films set in Washington, D.C.
Films shot in Vancouver
Films with screenplays by Craig Mazin
Films with screenplays by Pat Proft
Miramax films
Parodies of horror
The Ring (franchise)
Supernatural science fiction films